Lynnhaven Bay is an active fishing and recreational boating harbor located at the mouth of the Chesapeake Bay just east of the Chesapeake Bay Bridge Tunnel. Lynnhaven Bay has an extensive network of creeks and side channels that feed it.

References

Chesapeake Bay